The 1993 Boise State Broncos football team represented Boise State University in the 1993 NCAA Division I-AA football season. The Broncos competed in the Big Sky Conference and played their home games on campus at Bronco Stadium in Boise, Idaho. Led by first-year head coach Pokey Allen, Boise State finished the season 3–8 overall and 1–6 in conference.

Allen was previously the head coach at Portland State (of Division II), which had easily defeated BSU in Boise in 

Senior quarterback Travis Stuart, the starter in 1992, was declared academically ineligible in mid-August and missed the season. Sophomore Danny Langsdorf was the opening day starter, splitting time with junior college transfer Lee Schrack.

Schedule

Source:

References

Boise State
Boise State Broncos football seasons
Boise State Broncos football